This film Singye Galeem produced by Wisdom Picture was approved on the 29th of December, 2007 for public exhibition in Bhutan.

Plot
This is based on a true story of two lovers, Singye and Galem which happened in the early 1940s. Their story originated from Punakha which used to be the former capital of Bhutan. Singye works in the Punakha Dzong(Fortress/castle) as a messenger and Galem is an ordinary farm girl who is into weaving traditional clothes. It so happens that Singye meets Galem in the market where Galem has come to sell one of the clothes she wove. It's love at first sight and their romance begins. But unfortunately, their happiness comes to an end when the Chief of the district asks for Galem's hand for marriage. The chief also happens to be Singye's boss. At the same time, Singye is sent to a different location (Gasa) for an urgent task. Galem's parents agrees upon the offer provided by the Chief keeping in mind the wealth and fame that his daughter's matrimony would bring. However, Galem's heart breaks with the situation and she confesses to her father that she has already given her body and soul to a different man already. She further mentions that she is pregnant. These words deafens Galem's father and makes him furious; furious for bringing shame in the family and of course marrying a local man and having to disappoint the Chief! He then curses her, becomes violent and ties her on a rock in the banks of the Moo Chu river. The story has an emotional end. It's one of the finest replicas of "True Love" in the history of mankind.

Songs
 Nam kha yang me phodrang la
Lye kin nymph den pee gyelkhab
Dang Che wai kharsel dawa
Dangdra che Wei kharsel
Bu la pi gasum

Production
The film was produced by Yeshey Tshering and Sonam Wangchuk. Film locations include Thimphu and Punakha.

Filming Locations
Paro
Thimphu
Punakha
Gasa
Wangdue

Awards
Best Film at the 1st Viewers Choice Awards 2009

References

External links